Michael Deutsche (born 1 April 1992) is a German footballer who plays for TV Echterdingen in the seventh tier Landesliga Württemberg.

Early life
Deutsche was born in Nagold, Germany and first began playing youth soccer with VfL Nagold. He then moved on to the youth teams of VfB Stuttgart, Stuttgarter Kickers, and SSV Ulm 1846.

Club career
In 2011, he made his first-team debut with SSV Ulm in the Regionalliga Süd, the fourth tier in German football.

Deutsche began his career with 1. FC Heidenheim, and made his 3. Liga debut for the club in August 2012, as a substitute for Michael Thurk in a 1–1 draw with Preußen Münster. He was released by the club at the end of the 2013–14 season.

In 2014, he joined FC 08 Homburg. In 2017, he joined FSV 08 Bissingen. In 2020, he joined TSVgg Plattenhardt in the seventh tier Landesliga Württemberg. He scored a goal in his debut against TV89 Zuffenhausen. For the 2020/21 season, he became a co-player-coach with Plattenhardt. In 2022, he joined TV Echterdingen, also in the seventh tier Landesliga Württemberg.

References

External links

Michael Deutsche at Fupa

1992 births
Living people
German footballers
1. FC Heidenheim players
3. Liga players
Association football wingers
VfL Nagold players